Pergalumna indistincta is a species of mite first found in Cát Tiên National Park, Vietnam, in dark loam in a Lagerstroemia forest. This species is similar in notogastral areae porosae, punctate body surfaces, prodorsal setae morphology, and dorsosejugal suture, to Pergalumna amorpha, differing in body size and the development of its adanal setae.

References

Further reading

Ermilov, S. G., W. Niedbała, and A. E. Anichkin. "Oribatid mites of Dong Nai Biosphere Reserve (= Cat Tien National Park) of Southern Vietnam, with description of a new species of Pergalumna (Acari, Oribatida, Galumnidae)."Acarina 20.1 (2012): 20-28.
Ermilov, Sergey G., et al. "Contributions to the knowledge of oribatid mites of Indonesia. 2. The genus Pergalumna (Galumnidae) with description of a new species and key to known species in the Oriental region (Acari, Oribatida)." ZooKeys 529 (2015): 87.

Sarcoptiformes
Arachnids of Asia